Re Anglo-Austrian Printing & Publishing Union [1895] 2 Ch 891 is a UK insolvency law and company law case, concerning recovery of assets under a misfeasance action.  It was held that because the claims were vested in the company before the company went into liquidation, the proceeds of such a claim would be caught by a floating charge where the floating charge was expressed to include any after-acquired property.

Facts
An official receiver was appointed to pursue the former directors of the Anglo-Austrian Printing & Publishing Union for misfeasance, and other funds. It recovered £7000 in damages for misfeasance and £1200 in calls on unpaid shares from former shareholders. However, a group of debenture holders had not yet been paid. They claimed the money recovered was theirs, given that it first went to the company on which they held charges, and could not be used to pay unsecured creditors before the debentures were paid off.

Judgment
Vaughan Williams J held, reluctantly, that money recovered during liquidation from in proceedings under section 10 of the Companies (Winding-up) Act 1890 and by calls on contributories, belong to debenture holders charging all the undertaking and property of the company, when total assets are not enough. Costs for such proceedings must be paid first out of money recovered in those proceedings.

Authority
The case is still treated as good law and authoritative as to the proposition that it states.  However, in Re Yagerphone Ltd [1935] 1 Ch 392 the opposite conclusion was reached in relation to the proceeds of any action by the liquidator to set aside a transaction as an unfair preference.

See also

UK insolvency law
UK company law

Notes

References

United Kingdom insolvency case law
High Court of Justice cases
1895 in case law
1895 in British law